Lionel Bradley Pett (12 November 1909 – 2003) was a Canadian biochemist and nutritionist.

Academic career
Pett earned a BSA from Ontario Agriculture College, an MA and a PhD from University of Toronto before an MD from the University of Alberta. He worked at the  University of Toronto and  the University of Alberta before moving to the Nutrition Division of the Department of Pensions and Health in Ottawa, Ontario.

After his death, the questions were raised about the ethics of post-war experimentation he carried  out with Frederick Tisdall involving First Nations communities. The experiments appear to pre-date the 1966 seminal paper by Henry K. Beecher on the nature of informed consent and have become known as the First Nations nutrition experiments. Pett has been defended by his son.

Selected works
 Early stages of carbohydrate degradation by bacteria. MSc thesis, University of Toronto, 1932.
 The enzymatic breakdown of phosphoric acid esters. PhD thesis,  University of Toronto, 1934.
 Vitamin Requirements of Human Beings  Vitamins & Hormones Volume 13, 1955, Pages 213–237  
 A Canadian Table of Average Weights Can Med Assoc J.  1 January 1955; 72(1): 12–14.  
 A Canadian table of average weights for height, age, and sex American Journal of Public Health

References

External links
 google scholar

Academic staff of the University of Toronto
1909 births
2003 deaths
People from Winnipeg
Ontario Agricultural College alumni
University of Toronto alumni
University of Alberta alumni
Canadian biochemists
20th-century Canadian civil servants
Academic staff of the University of Alberta